The University train of La Plata is a commuter rail service part of Roca Line, currently being operated by State-owned company Trenes Argentinos. Trains run within La Plata city of Buenos Aires Province in Argentina.

History 

The service was officially opened on 26 April 2013. The units are railbuses powered by a 1.7-litre diesel engines manufactured by FIAT and were manufactured and assembled by TecnoTren, a local company which developed a train that runs on abandoned tracks.

The train runs through the Paseo del Bosque of La Plata, connecting La Plata station with the University of La Plata campus buildings, finishing its trip at the "General San Martín" polyclinic.

The service was interrupted in February 2014 when the units were sent to workshops for maintenance and inspection works, being reestablished one month later. In December 2014, the TecnoTren units were replaced by NOHAB railcars built in 1948 and imported in the 2000s from Portugal.

State-owned company Trenes Argentinos took over Roca line (operated by Argentren) after the Government of Argentina rescinded the contracts signed with the company on 2 March 2015. The contract terms specified that the concession could be cancelled with no right to claim compensation. The agreements had been signed in February 2014, committing Argentren and Corredores Ferroviarios to operate the lines.

In March 2020, it was signed an agreement between the National University of La Plata and the Ministry of Transport to build an extension of  length from Policlínico to the city of Los Hornos, also building new six stops in that path. The tender was launched in April 2021, with an estimated end of works in April 2022.

Historic operators 

Companies that have operated the University train have been:

References

External links

 

U
Railway services introduced in 2013
U
U
Rail transport in Buenos Aires Province